Pholiota is a genus of small to medium-sized, fleshy mushrooms in the family Strophariaceae. They are saprobes that typically live on wood. The genus has a widespread distribution, especially in temperate regions, and contains about 150 species.

Pholiota is derived from the Greek word pholis, meaning "scale".

Taxonomic details

The genus Pholiota includes mushrooms, with scaly, glutinous to dry cap surfaces, and that frequently grow on wood or at the bases of trees or on decaying tree roots, and spores that are brown, light brown, or yellowish brown in deposit. These spores are smooth with a germ pore, although the germ pore can be quite narrow in species. Usually the species have pleurocystidia that include a type called chrysocystidia. There have been several varying concepts of the genus, ranging from a pre-molecular era very broad concept that nowadays would include the genera Phaeolepiota, Phaeonematoloma, Flammula, Meottomyces,  some Stropharia species, some Hypholoma species, Hemipholiota, Hemistropharia, some Kuehneromyces and some Phaeomarasmius, etc. Currently the genus is restricted to a smaller but still large group of species that primarily grow on wood, causing a white rot, but other taxa occur on burnt ground following forest fires or camp fires, on peaty or forest soil, but none are known to be mycorrhizal. Many species have prominent partial veils and form an annulus or annular ring on their stipes. None of the species have purplish or purplish brown spore prints. None form acanthocytes on their mycelia.

Selected species

References

External links

Agaricomycetes genera
Strophariaceae